Hossein Allahkaram is an Iranian conservative activist, pundit and former military officer.

He is head of the coordination council of Ansar-e-Hezbollah and is described as its theoretician.

Military career
A veteran of Iran–Iraq War, he was reported continuing to serve in the Revolutionary Guards as of 2001. According to some sources, he commanded the Quds Force in the Bosnian War along with Mohammad Reza Naqdi.

References

Living people
Islamic Revolutionary Guard Corps brigadier generals
Islamic Revolutionary Guard Corps personnel of the Iran–Iraq War
Ansar-e Hezbollah politicians
Political commentators
1945 births
Iranian individuals subject to the U.S. Department of the Treasury sanctions